Botala , is a village and one of the 51 Union Councils of Khushab District in the Punjab Province of Pakistan. It is situated 3.5 km south from the main Mianwali-Lahore road. It is about 12 kilometers distance from district headquarters Jauahrabad and 60 kilometers from divisional headquarters Sargodha.

Areas 
Sub Areas: Pindi, Jhugi Manday Wali, Handan Wala, Balkian Aala Boad, Neher Pul Jabbi
Different parts of the agricultural areas of the village: Tapian, Gada Maar, Jhugi Manday Wali, Hadan Wala, Shero, Kamoon

Population 
Population is about 36,000.

Geography 
The lands of the village are fertile with 98% irrigated areas and 2% desert.

Economy 
Crops: The major crops of botala are sugarcane, rice, wheat, etc.
Canal and irrigation system: There are 5 major canals in the lands of Botala. Hundreds of water courses are lying there.
Deserts: The great Thal Desert starts from Botala and its native town Hadali as well.

PICS Gallery

References
 Local Government Elections - Government of Pakistan

External links

Union councils of Khushab District
Populated places in Khushab District